Marco Rubio (born 1971) is a U.S. Senator from Florida since 2011. 

Senator Rubio may also refer to:

Michael Rubio (born 1977), California State Senate
Susan Rubio (born 1970), California State Senate